(Red) Christmas EP, stylised as (RED) Christmas EP, is the first extended play (EP) by American rock band The Killers. It was released digitally on November 29, 2011, by Island Records. The EP features the band's yearly Christmas singles from 2006 to 2011. Proceeds from the sales from the (Red) Christmas EP have been donated to the Product Red campaign, headed by Bobby Shriver and U2 lead singer Bono.

Background
The Killers have become recognized for their work with the Product Red campaign, headed by Bono and Bobby Shriver. Every year between 2006 and 2016, the band released a Christmas song in support of the campaign. Every single came out around December 1 (coinciding with World AIDS Day). As of the EP, they had released six Christmas-themed songs and music videos: "A Great Big Sled" (2006), "Don't Shoot Me Santa" (2007), "Joseph, Better You Than Me" (2008), "¡Happy Birthday Guadalupe!" (2009), "Boots" (2010), and "The Cowboys' Christmas Ball" (2011).

On November 30, 2011, the band released the (Red) Christmas EP on iTunes which features the first six songs. All proceeds from the songs have been donated to Product Red campaign and the fight against AIDS in Africa. The EP also features guest appearances from Elton John, Neil Tennant (Pet Shop Boys), Toni Halliday (Curve), Wild Light, and Mariachi El Bronx.

Singles
The Killers' 2011 Christmas single, "The Cowboys' Christmas Ball", was released as the lead single from the EP.

Commercial performance
The album debuted on the US Billboard 200 at number 85. It also opened on the Billboard Digital Albums chart at number 10, Rock Albums at number 11, and Alternative Albums at number nine.

Track listing

Notes
  signifies an additional producer
  signifies a co-producer

Charts

References

2011 Christmas albums
2011 debut EPs
Albums produced by Alan Moulder
Albums produced by Flood (producer)
Albums produced by Stuart Price
Charity albums
Christmas albums by American artists
Christmas EPs
Island Records EPs
The Killers EPs
Albums produced by Joe Chiccarelli